The Japanese electronics industry is one of the largest in the world, though the share of Japanese electronics companies has significantly declined from its peak due to competition from South Korea, Taiwan, China, and the United States.

Japanese companies have been responsible for a number of important innovations, including having pioneered the transistor radio and the Walkman (Sony), the first mass-produced laptops (Toshiba), the VHS recorder (JVC), and solar cells and LCD screens (Sharp).

Major Japanese electronics companies include Akai, Brother, Canon, Casio, Citizen, Fujifilm, Fujitsu, Hitachi, JVCKenwood, Konica Minolta, Kyocera, Mitsubishi Electric, NEC, Nikon, Nintendo, Olympus, Onkyo, Panasonic, Pioneer, Ricoh, Seiko Group, Sharp, Sony, TDK, Toshiba and Yamaha.

History

Japan's foreign direct investment in the consumer electronics industry was motivated by protectionism and labor costs, encouraging foreign capital to invest in a country with lower production overhead and prewar industrial knowhow to be competitive in the electronics market. After three years of voluntary export restraints, seven Japanese firms located plants in the United States by 1980. Japanese firms continued production of the most technologically advanced products especially in Japan but also the U.S., while shifting production of less-advanced products to developing countries in Southeast Asia.

Circa 1997 Japanese children had a relatively large amount of savings, with the average having about 110,000 Japanese yen (about $900 U.S. dollars) in allowances, which stimulated purchases of electronic goods like Tamagotchi.

21st century

Since the beginning of the 21st century, a number of the largest Japanese electronics companies have struggled financially and lost market share, particularly to South Korean, Taiwanese, and Chinese companies.  Japanese companies have lost their dominant position in categories including portable media players, TVs, computers and semiconductors. Hit hard by the economic crisis of 2008 Sony, Hitachi, Panasonic, Fujitsu, Sharp, NEC, and Toshiba reported losses amounting to $17 billion. By 2009, Samsung Electronics (South Korea) operating profit was more than two times larger than the combined operating profit of nine of Japan's largest consumer electronics companies. The relative decline has been ascribed to factors including high costs, the value of the yen and too many Japanese companies producing the same class of products, causing a duplication in research and development efforts and reducing economies of scale and pricing power. Japan's education system has also been highlighted as a possible contributing factor. The lack of adaptation to the Digital Revolution and the shift from hardware to software-oriented product development has also been cited.

One response to the challenges has been a rise in company mergers and acquisitions. JVC and Kenwood merged (forming JVCKenwood), and Renesas Technology and NEC Electronics -the semiconductors arm of NEC- to merge forming Renesas Electronics. In a similar move, in 2009 Panasonic acquired a voting stock majority of Sanyo, making the latter part of the Panasonic Group. Also some of the bigger players resorted to merging some of their operations as Hitachi, Casio and NEC, and Fujitsu and Toshiba, did with their cellphone business.
On 15 November 2011, facing tough competition from Samsung and LG; Sony, Toshiba and Hitachi signed a deal to merge their LCD businesses, creating a new company called Japan Display by spring 2012.

As of 2013, most Japanese companies no longer enjoy the same reputation they did about one to two decades ago. Currently, the international electronics consumer market is a competition between Japanese, South Korean, Chinese, Taiwanese, and American industries. Quite a few Japanese companies still have significant international market share. The future of the Japanese electronics industry is debated.

See also
 Electronics industry in China
 Japan Electronics and Information Technology Industries Association

References

External links
Japan Electronics and Information Technology Industries Association (JEITA)
Japan Electric Manufacturers' Association (JEMA)
Japan Refrigeration and Air Conditioning Industry Association (JRAIA)
Japan Electric Measuring Instruments Manufacturers' Association (JEMIMA)
Association for Electric Home Appliances 
Industrial Structure Vision 2010 (METI)  (full report, Electronics and IT sectors, Functional Chemical sector (p.190) )
Panasonic EH-SA31VP Spa-Quality Facial Steamer